Azna Rural District is a rural district (dehestan) in the Central District of Khorramabad County, Lorestan Province, Iran. At the 2006 census, its population was 6,214, in 1,200 families.  The rural district has 27 villages.

References 

Rural Districts of Lorestan Province
Khorramabad County